Leslie "Les" N. Gorley (1950  – September 11, 2019)  was an English former professional rugby league footballer who played in the 1970s and 1980s. He played at representative level for Great Britain, England and Cumbria, and at club level for Workington Town and Widnes as a second row, i.e. number 11 or 12, during the era of contested scrums.

Background
Gorley was born in Great Broughton, Cumberland, England.

Playing career

International honours
Gorley won caps for England while at Workington in 1977 against Wales, while at Widnes in 1981 against Wales (sub), and won caps for Great Britain while at Widnes in 1980 against New Zealand, and New Zealand (sub), in 1981 against France (2 matches), and in 1982 against Australia.

County honours
Gorley represented Cumbria.

Challenge Cup Final appearances
Les Gorley appeared in five Challenge Cup Finals with Widnes, he played left-, i.e. number 11, in Widnes' 18–9 victory over Hull Kingston Rovers in the 1981 Challenge Cup Final during the 1980–81 season at Wembley Stadium, London on Saturday 2 May 1981, in front of a crowd of 92,496, played left- in the 14-14 draw with Hull F.C. in the 1982 Challenge Cup Final during the 1981–82 season at Wembley Stadium, London on Saturday 1 May 1982, in front of a crowd of 92,147, played left- in the 9-18 defeat by Hull F.C. in the 1982 Challenge Cup Final replay during the 1981–82 season at Elland Road, Leeds on Wednesday 19 May 1982, in front of a crowd of 41,171, and played left-, i.e. number 11, in the 19–6 victory over Wigan in the 1984 Challenge Cup Final during the 1983–84 season at Wembley Stadium, London on Saturday 5 May 1984, in front of a crowd of 80,116.

County Cup Final appearances
Les Gorley played right-, i.e. number 12, in Workington Town's 11-16 defeat by Widnes in the 1976 Lancashire County Cup Final during the 1976–77 season at Central Park, Wigan on Saturday 30 October 1976, played left-, i.e. number 11, in the 13-10 victory over Wigan in the 1977 Final during the 1977–78 season at Wilderspool Stadium, Warrington on Saturday 29 October 1977, played as an interchange/substitute, i.e. number 15, (replacing  William Pattinson) and scored a try in the 13-15 defeat by Widnes in the 1978 Lancashire County Cup Final during the 1978–79 season at Central Park, Wigan on Saturday 7 October 1978, played left-, i.e. number 11, in Widnes 11-0 victory over Workington Town in the 1979 Lancashire County Cup Final during the 1979–80 season at The Willows, Salford on Saturday 8 December 1979, and played left- in the 3-8 defeat by Leigh in the 1981 Lancashire County Cup Final during the 1981–82 season at Central Park, Wigan on Saturday 26 September 1981.

John Player/John Player Special Trophy Final appearances
Les Gorley played left-, i.e. number 11, in Widnes' 0-6 defeat by Bradford Northern in the 1979–80 John Player Trophy Final during the 1979–80 season at Headingley Rugby Stadium, Leeds on Saturday 5 January 1980, and played left- in the 10-18 defeat by Leeds in the 1983–84 John Player Special Trophy Final during the 1983–84 season at Central Park, Wigan on Saturday 14 January 1984.

Personal life
Les Gorley was the elder brother of the rugby league footballer; Peter Gorley.

References

External links
(archived by web.archive.org) » Legends Evening 70's
Statistics at rugby.widnes.tv

1950 births
2019 deaths
Cumbria rugby league team players
England national rugby league team players
English rugby league players
Great Britain national rugby league team players
Rugby league players from Broughton, Cumbria
Rugby league second-rows
Widnes Vikings players
Workington Town players
Date of birth missing